Storckiella australiensis is a species of large rainforest legume trees up to  tall, constituting part of the plant family Fabaceae. It has the common name white bean.

They are endemic to a restricted lowland area of luxuriant rainforests in the wet tropics of northeastern Queensland, Australia.

References

Flora of Queensland
Dialioideae
Taxa named by Bernard Hyland